Robin Hood: Prince of Thieves is a 1991 American action adventure film based on the English folk tale of Robin Hood that originated in the 12th century. It was directed by Kevin Reynolds and stars Kevin Costner as Robin Hood, Morgan Freeman as Azeem, Christian Slater as Will Scarlett, Mary Elizabeth Mastrantonio as Marian, and Alan Rickman as the Sheriff of Nottingham. The screenplay was written by Pen Densham and John Watson.

The film received mixed reviews from critics, who praised Freeman's and Rickman's performances and the music, but criticized Costner's performance, the screenplay, and the overall execution. Nevertheless, it was a box office success, grossing more than $390 million worldwide, making it the second-highest-grossing film of 1991. Rickman received the BAFTA Award for Best Actor in a Supporting Role for his performance as George, Sheriff of Nottingham. The theme song "(Everything I Do) I Do It for You" by Bryan Adams was nominated for the Academy Award for Best Original Song, and it won the Grammy Award for Best Song Written for Visual Media.

Plot
In 1194, English nobleman Robin of Locksley has spent years in an Ayyubid prison in Jerusalem, having followed King Richard the Lionheart on the Third Crusade. Robin and his comrade Peter Dubois escape, saving the life of a Moor named Azeem. Mortally wounded, Peter makes Robin swear to protect his sister Marian, and Robin returns to England with Azeem, who vows to accompany him until his life-debt is repaid. 

In King Richard's absence, the cruel Sheriff of Nottingham plots to seize the throne for himself, and has Robin's father killed for remaining loyal to the king. Arriving home, Robin saves a young boy from the Sheriff's ruthless cousin, Guy of Gisbourne. He finds his father's corpse, and his family's servant Duncan, blinded by Gisbourne, explains that his father was falsely accused of devil worship. The Sheriff consults the witch Mortianna, who foresees King Richard's return and that Robin and Azeem "will be our deaths".

Robin tells Marian of her brother's death, but she sees little need for his protection. Fleeing the Sheriff's forces into Sherwood Forest, Robin and Azeem encounter a group of outlaws led by Little John, who challenges Robin to a duel. Robin wins and earns John's friendship, but the bandit Will Scarlet refuses to trust him. Confronting the corrupt Bishop of Hereford for his role in his father's death, Robin humiliates the Sheriff, who sends Gisbourne to terrorize the peasants in the search for "Robin of the Hood".

Despite the price on his head, Robin shapes the growing band of outlaws into a formidable force against the Sheriff. They rob rich folk passing through the forest and distribute the stolen wealth and food among the poor, and are joined by the beer-loving Friar Tuck. Marian offers Robin any aid she can, and they fall in love. Robin's success and public support infuriates the Sheriff, who worsens his abuse of the peasants and kills Gisbourne for failing to stop the outlaws. Mortianna advises the Sheriff to recruit fearsome Celtic warriors, and that he must marry someone of royal blood: Marian, the king's cousin.

Betrayed by the Bishop, Marian is taken prisoner and Duncan rides to warn Robin, unknowingly followed by the Sheriff's men. They storm Sherwood with Celtic reinforcements and burn Robin's hideout, capturing many of the outlaws. With Robin presumed dead, the Sheriff threatens the prisoners and their families, forcing Marian to agree to marriage. Will bargains with the Sheriff to betray Robin and returns to Sherwood, but instead reveals that he is Robin's half-brother and they reconcile.

On the day of the wedding, Robin and his men infiltrate Nottingham Castle and save the outlaws from being hanged. With the help of Azeem's explosive powder, they free the prisoners, and Azeem inspires the peasants to revolt, forcing the Sheriff to retreat with Marian into his keep. The Bishop hastily performs the marriage, but before the Sheriff can consummate it, Robin bursts in. Friar Tuck finds the Bishop fleeing with gold, and burdens him with additional treasure before defenestrating him. In a fierce duel, Robin kills the Sheriff, and Azeem kills Mortianna in defense of Robin, fulfilling his life-debt.

Later, Robin and Marian's wedding in Sherwood is interrupted by the return of King Richard, who gives the bride away and thanks Robin for saving his throne.

Cast

Production

Development
In August 1989, British writer-producer Pen Densham broke with the traditional account of Robin Hood as a devil-may-care adventurer, best embodied by Errol Flynn in The Adventures of Robin Hood in 1938. He instead reimagined Robin as a rich kid transformed into a socially conscious rebel by imprisonment in Jerusalem during the Crusades. He wrote a 92-page outline, which was then rewritten as a screenplay by his producing partner, John Watson. On February 14, 1990, Morgan Creek, the small production company of Young Guns (1988) and Major League (1989), saw "gold on the page" and immediately funded the film. Watson scouted filming locations in the United Kingdom, setting September 3 as the filming deadline in aggressive competition against other potential Robin Hood remakes from Twentieth Century Fox (Morgan Creek's former distribution partner) and TriStar Pictures.

Kevin Reynolds had directed Kevin Costner extensively in the past, including the challenging buffalo hunt scene of Dances with Wolves. Reynolds said: "I'd done two pictures that hadn't made a dime, so I kind of knew [the studio] wanted me [for Robin Hood] because of my connections with Kevin." Indeed, Costner had already rejected the script until hearing that Reynolds was directing: "I felt Kevin was such a good filmmaker I would do it".

Reynolds said, "what I did not want to do was Indiana Jones. That has been done already". Costner wanted an accent, but Reynolds thought it would distract audiences, and their indecision resulted in a drastically uneven delivery between each scene. EW reported, "Even before it was finished, Costner was the subject of embarrassing rumors that his performance was too laid-back and his accent more LA than UK."

For the role of King Richard, comedian John Cleese was proposed but Sean Connery was selected at the passionate behest of Costner and Densham. Fearing that the sudden cameo of a notorious comedic icon would destroy the drama, Densham recalls, "I so wanted to not have John Cleese that I said, 'Would you give me Sean Connery? We can't give him a credit because you can't have the audience waiting for the whole movie to see him — but he only has to work one day." His requested $1 million fee was negotiated down to $250,000 and paid to a hospital in Connery's native Scotland as charitable compromise for making film history with the already over-budget project.

In 2015, Alan Rickman admitted he had secretly asked his scriptwriter friends Ruby Wax and Peter Barnes to punch up the script: "Will you have a look at this script because it's terrible, and I need some good lines." Reynolds added their lines.

Filming
Costner's explosive career gave him only a few days between the long-term epic projects of Dances with Wolves, Robin Hood, and JFK. This project's timeframe was compressed by the cold seasons in England and by competition with other possible Robin Hood films, giving Reynolds only 10 weeks for preproduction and little time for planning, rehearsal, or revision. Costner said, "It's very dangerous to be [working] so fast. We are relying on the weather, and every time the weather turns against us we could get behind. When that happens there is always the feeling that certain people want to do something about it to shorten the filming time. That is not always the cure." Reynolds said, "Are things going as planned? Ha! You always start with a picture in your mind, and it is a compromise all the way from there. We have been struggling from Day One. We are trying to finish by Christmas, and the days are getting shorter. It's horrible."

Principal exteriors were shot on location in the United Kingdom. A second unit filmed the medieval walls and towers of the Cité de Carcassonne in the town of Carcassonne in Aude, France, for the portrayal of Nottingham and its castle. Locksley Castle was Wardour Castle in Wiltshire—restored in an early shot using a matte painting. Marian's manor was filmed at Hulne Priory in Northumberland. Scenes set in Sherwood Forest were filmed at various locations in England: the outlaws' encampment was filmed at Burnham Beeches in Buckinghamshire, south of the real Sherwood Forest in Nottinghamshire; the fight scene between Robin and Little John was at Aysgarth Falls in North Yorkshire; and Marian sees Robin bathing at Hardraw Force, also in North Yorkshire. Sycamore Gap on Hadrian's Wall in Northumberland was used for the scene when Robin first confronts the sheriff's men. Chalk cliffs at Seven Sisters, Sussex were used as the locale for Robin's return to England from the Crusades.

Interior scenes were completed at Shepperton Studios in Surrey.

Post-production
Furious at the studio's repeated demands for yet another heavy editing session just to boost Costner's presence and prevent Rickman's performance from stealing the movieand at the studio locking his own editor out of the cutting roomReynolds walked out of the project weeks before theatrical debut. He did not attend the screening.

Extended Version
A 155-minute Extended Version of the film was released as a 2-disc Special Edition on DVD on June 10, 2003. The 2003 cut adds 12 minutes of previously unreleased footage, which details the conspirators' plot to steal the throne from King Richard, and further explores the relationship between the Sheriff and Mortianna. In one scene, Mortianna explains that she killed the true George Nottingham as a baby and replaced him with her own infant son, revealing that she is the Sheriff's real mother. In another scene, Mortianna accuses the Sheriff's scribe (John Tordoff) of being disloyal, and suggests the Sheriff remove the scribe's tongue. A subsequent added scene shows the now-tongueless scribe forced to communicate via chalkboard. This creates a continuity error with a later scene that is retained from the theatrical cut, in which the scribe easily provides spoken directions to Robin and Azeem as they rescue Marian.

Release
The film was released in the United States and Canada on June 14, 1991, in 2,369 theaters and a record 3,175 screens.

Classification
Robin Hood: Prince of Thieves was submitted for classification from the British Board of Film Classification, which required fourteen seconds to be cut from the film to obtain a PG rating.

Home media
The original theatrical cut of the film was released on VHS in the US on October 30, 1991, and on DVD on September 30, 1997. A 2-disc special-edition DVD was released in the US on June 10, 2003, containing a 155-minute-long extended version of the film. This alternate cut of the film was released on Blu-ray in the US on May 26, 2009.

Reception

Box office
The film grossed $25 million in its opening weekend and $18.3 million in its second. It eventually earned $390,493,908 at the global box office, making it the second-highest-grossing film of 1991, immediately behind Terminator 2: Judgment Day. It had the second-best opening to date for a non-sequel.

Critical response

On Rotten Tomatoes, the film holds an approval rating of 50% based on 56 reviews, with an average rating of 5.60/10. The critical consensus reads, "Robin Hood: Prince of Thieves brings a wonderfully villainous Alan Rickman to this oft-adapted tale, but he's robbed by big-budget bombast and a muddled screenplay." On Metacritic, the film has a weighted average score of 51 out of 100, based on 25 critics, indicating "mixed or average reviews". Audiences polled by CinemaScore gave the film an average grade of "A" on an A+ to F scale.

Chicago Sun-Times critic Roger Ebert praised the performances of Freeman and Rickman, but ultimately decried the film as a whole, giving it two stars and stating, "Robin Hood: Prince of Thieves is a murky, unfocused, violent, and depressing version of the classic story... The most depressing thing about the movie is that children will attend it expecting to have a good time." The New York Times gave the film a negative review, with Vincent Canby writing that the movie is "a mess, a big, long, joyless reconstruction of the Robin Hood legend that comes out firmly for civil rights, feminism, religious freedom, and economic opportunity for all." The Los Angeles Times also found the movie unsatisfactory, criticizing Costner for not attempting an English accent, mocking Robin's afternoon walk from the White Cliffs to Nottingham via Hadrian's Wall, which is actually .

Desson Thomson, writing for The Washington Post, gave a more positive review: "Fair damsels and noble sirs, you must free yourselves of these wearisome observations. This is a state-of-the-art retelling of a classic." Owen Gleiberman, of Entertainment Weekly also gave a positive review: "As a piece of escapism, this deluxe, action-heavy, 2-hour-and-21-minute Robin Hood gets the job done." Lanre Bakare, writing in The Guardian, calls Rickman's Sheriff, for which he won a BAFTA, a "genuinely great performance".

Accolades

In 2005, the American Film Institute nominated this film for AFI's 100 Years of Film Scores.

Music

The original music score was composed, orchestrated and conducted by Michael Kamen. In 2017, the specialty film music label Intrada Records released a two-disc CD album containing the complete score and alternates, though not the songs from Bryan Adams and Jeff Lynne. In 2020, Intrada issued a four-disc album, with the film score on the first 2 CDs; CD 3 has alternate takes and additional music, including the Morgan Creek Productions fanfare which was derived from this score; CD 4 features the assemblies used on the 1991 soundtrack album. The songs are again absent.

Certifications

Other media
Two tie-in video games called Robin Hood: Prince of Thieves were released in 1991 for the Nintendo Entertainment System and Game Boy. Developed by Sculptured Software Inc. and Bits Studios, respectively, and published by Virgin Games, Inc., they are the cover feature for the July 1991 issue of Nintendo Power magazine.

Kenner released a toy line consisting of action figures and playsets. All but one of the figures were derived by slight modifications to Kenner's well-known Super Powers line, and Friar Tuck, the vehicles, and playsets were modified from Star Wars: Return of the Jedi toys.

See also

 Princess of Thieves – 2001 television movie
 Robin Hood: Men in Tights – 1993 parody film
 Robin Hood – 1991 British film
 Robin Hood – English folk tale

References

External links

 
 
 
 
 "The Battle of Sherwood Forest" , a 1991 Entertainment Weekly cover story about the film's tumultuous production.
 Robin Hood: Prince of Thieves Transcript

1990s action adventure films
1991 romantic drama films
1991 action films
1991 adventure films
American action adventure films
American romantic drama films
American vigilante films
Crusades films
Cultural depictions of Richard I of England
Films about witchcraft
Films directed by Kevin Reynolds
Films scored by Michael Kamen
Films set in Cumbria
Films set in Jerusalem
Films set in Kent
Films set in the 12th century
Films shot at Shepperton Studios
Films shot in Buckinghamshire
Films shot in East Sussex
Films shot in England
Films shot in France
Films shot in Hampshire
Films shot in North Yorkshire
Films shot in Northumberland
Films shot in Wiltshire
Morgan Creek Productions films
Robin Hood films
Warner Bros. films
Golden Raspberry Award winning films
1990s English-language films
1990s American films